Star Insight was a fortnightly magazine published as a supplement to The Daily Star, Bangladesh's largest circulated English newspaper. The magazine aimed at promoting people and events and achievements from underprivileged rural and townships of Bangladesh. Prominent figures of Bangladesh like Shykh Seraj and Faridur Reza Sagar contributed to the magazine. Publication began in July 1996. The magazine ceased publication in April 2013 and was integrated into the national page of The Daily Star.

Sections
Regular Sections
Story
Crossword/Brain Twisters

Recurring sections
Feature
Journey Through Bangladesh
Guru Griho
She
Behind the Scene

Team
Rafi Hossain = Editor In Charge
Zahidul Naim Zakaria = Assistant Editor
Hasan Ameen Sahuddin = Sub-editor
Zia Nazmul = Graphic Designer

Activities
Star Insight team organized annual event called Celebrating Life on behalf of the Daily Star and supported by Standard Chartered Bank. it recognized the best in photography film and lyrics.

References

External links
 Celebrating Life

1996 establishments in Bangladesh
2013 disestablishments in Bangladesh
Biweekly magazines
Defunct magazines published in Bangladesh
English-language magazines
Magazines established in 1996
Magazines disestablished in 2013
Newspaper supplements